Joyskim Aurélien Dawa Tchakonte (born 9 April 1996) is a Cameroonian professional footballer who plays as a centre-back for Liga I club FCSB  and the Cameroon national team.

Club career
On 2 February 2018, Dawa signed for Mariupol of the Ukrainian Premier League.

On 22 June 2022, Dawa joined Liga I side FCSB for an undisclosed fee.

International career
Dawa made his debut for the Cameroon national team in a goalless draw with Malawi in the Africa Cup of Nations qualifiers, on 16 October 2018.

Career statistics

Club

International

References

External links

1996 births
Living people
Sportspeople from Colombes
Cameroonian footballers
Cameroon international footballers
Cameroon youth international footballers
French footballers
French sportspeople of Cameroonian descent
Citizens of Cameroon through descent
Gil Vicente F.C. players
FC Mariupol players
Ukrainian Premier League players
Cameroonian expatriate footballers
Expatriate footballers in Portugal
Cameroonian expatriate sportspeople in Portugal
Expatriate footballers in Ukraine
Cameroonian expatriate sportspeople in Ukraine
Association football defenders
Footballers from Hauts-de-Seine
2019 Africa Cup of Nations players
Valmieras FK players
Latvian Higher League players
Expatriate footballers in Latvia
Cameroonian expatriate sportspeople in Latvia
FC Botoșani players
Liga I players
FC Steaua București players
Cameroonian expatriate sportspeople in Romania
Expatriate footballers in Romania
Cameroonian expatriate sportspeople in Monaco